Ulm is a city in the German state of Baden-Württemberg, situated on the river Danube on the border with Bavaria. The city, which has an estimated population of more than 126,000 (2018), forms an urban district of its own and is the administrative seat of the Alb-Donau district.

Founded around 850, Ulm is rich in history and traditions as a former free imperial city. The neighbouring town of Neu-Ulm in Bavaria was part of Ulm until 1810.

Today, Ulm is an economic centre due to its varied industries, and it is the seat of the University of Ulm. Internationally, the city is primarily known for having the church with the tallest steeple in the world, the Gothic minster (Ulm Minster, German: Ulmer Münster), and as the birthplace of Albert Einstein.

Geography 

Most parts of the city, including the old town, are situated on the northern bank of the Danube; only the districts of Wiblingen, Gögglingen, Donaustetten and Unterweiler lie on the southern bank. Across from the old town, on the other side of the river, lies the twin city of Neu-Ulm in the state of Bavaria, smaller than Ulm and, until 1810, a part of it (population c. 50,000).

The city of Ulm is situated in the northern part of the North Alpine Foreland basin, where the basin reaches the Swabian Alb. The Turritellenplatte of Ermingen ("Erminger Turritellenplatte") is a famous palaeontological site of Burdigalian age.

Neighboring communes 

On the right (south-eastern) side of Danube and Iller there is the Bavarian district town Neu-Ulm. On the left (north-western) side Ulm is almost completely surrounded by the Alb-Danube district. The neighbouring communes of Baden-Württemberg are the following: Illerkirchberg, Staig, Hüttisheim, Erbach (Donau), Blaubeuren, Blaustein, Dornstadt, Beimerstetten and Langenau as well as the eastern neighbouring community Elchingen.

Town subdivisions 

The city is divided into 18 districts: Ulm-Mitte, Böfingen, Donaustetten, Donautal, Eggingen, Einsingen, Ermingen, Eselsberg, Gögglingen, Grimmelfingen, Jungingen, Lehr, Mähringen, Oststadt, Söflingen (with Harthausen), Unterweiler, Weststadt, and Wiblingen.

Nine districts were integrated during the latest municipality reform in the 1970s: Eggingen, Einsingen, Ermingen, Gögglingen-Donaustetten, Jungingen, Lehr, Mähringen und Unterweiler. They have their own local councils which acquire an important consulting position to the whole city council concerning issues that are related to the prevailing districts. But at the end, final decisions can only be made by the city council of the entire city of Ulm.

History 

The oldest traceable settlement of the Ulm area began in the early Neolithic period, around 5000 BC. Settlements of this time have been identified at the villages of Eggingen and Lehr, today districts of the city. In the city area of Ulm proper, the oldest find dates from the late Neolithic period. The earliest written mention of Ulm is dated 22 July 854 AD, when King Louis of the Germans signed a document in the King's palace of "Hulma" in the Duchy of Swabia. The city was declared an Imperial City by Friedrich Barbarossa in 1181.

At first, Ulm's significance was due to the privilege of a Königspfalz, a place of accommodation for the medieval German kings and emperors on their frequent travels. Later, Ulm became a city of traders and craftsmen. One of the most important legal documents of the city, an agreement between the Ulm patricians and the trade guilds, dates from 1397. This document, considered an early city constitution, and the beginning of the construction of an enormous church (Ulm Minster, 1377), financed by the inhabitants of Ulm themselves rather than by the church, demonstrate the assertiveness of Ulm's medieval citizens. Ulm blossomed during the 15th and 16th centuries, mostly due to the export of high-quality textiles. The city was situated at the crossroads of important trade routes extending to Italy. These centuries, during which many important buildings were erected, also represented the zenith of art in Ulm, especially for painters and sculptors like Hans Multscher and Jörg Syrlin the Elder. During the Reformation, Ulm became Protestant (1530). With the establishment of new trade routes following the discovery of the New World (16th century) and the outbreak and consequences of the Thirty Years' War (1618–1648), the city began to decline gradually. During the War of the Spanish Succession (1701–1714), it was alternately invaded several times by French and Bavarian soldiers.

In the wars following the French Revolution, the city was alternately occupied by French and Austrian forces, with the former ones destroying the city fortifications. In 1803, it lost the status of Imperial City and was absorbed into Bavaria. During the campaign of 1805, Napoleon managed to trap the invading Austrian army of General Mack and forced it to surrender in the Battle of Ulm. In 1810, Ulm was incorporated into the Kingdom of Württemberg and lost its districts on the other bank of the Danube, which came to be known as Neu-Ulm (New Ulm).

In the mid-19th century, the city was designated a fortress of the German Confederation with huge military construction works directed primarily against the threat of a French invasion. The city became an important centre of industrialisation in southern Germany in the second half of the 19th century, its built-up area now being extended beyond the medieval walls. The construction of the huge minster, which had been interrupted in the 16th century for economic reasons, was resumed and eventually finished (1844–1891) in a wave of German national enthusiasm for the Middle Ages.

From 1933 to 1935, a concentration camp primarily for political opponents of the regime was established on the Kuhberg, one of the hills surrounding Ulm. The Jews of Ulm, around 500 people, were first discriminated against and later persecuted; their synagogue was torn down during  in November 1938. Of 116 Jews deported from Ulm during World War II (45 were sent to Theresienstadt on 22 August 1942), only four returned. Approximately 25 Jews were living in Ulm in 1968.

The sole RAF strategic bombing during World War II against Ulm occurred on 17 December 1944, against the two large lorry factories of Magirus-Deutz and Kässbohrer, as well as other industries, barracks, and depots in Ulm. The Gallwitz Barracks and several military hospitals were among 14 Wehrmacht establishments destroyed. The raid killed 707 Ulm inhabitants and left 25,000 homeless and after all the bombings, over 80% of the medieval city centre lay in ruins.

Most of the city was rebuilt in the plain and simple style of the 1950s and 1960s, but some of the historic landmark buildings have been restored. Due to its almost complete destruction in 1944, the Hirschstraße part of the city primarily consists of modern architecture. Ulm experienced substantial growth in the decades following World War II, with the establishment of large new housing projects and new industrial zones. In 1967, Ulm University was founded, which proved to be of great importance for the development of the city. Particularly since the 1980s, the transition from classical industry towards the high-tech sector has accelerated, with, for example, the establishment of research centres of companies like Daimler, Siemens and Nokia and a number of small applied research institutes near the university campus. The city today is still growing, forming a twin city of 170,000 inhabitants together with its neighbouring Bavarian city of Neu-Ulm, and seems to benefit from its central position between the cities of Stuttgart and Munich and thus between the cultural and economic hubs of southern Germany.

Demographics

Economy 

The city has very old trading traditions dating from medieval times and a long history of industrialisation, beginning with the establishment of a railway station in 1850. The most important sector is still classical industry (machinery, especially motor vehicles; electronics; pharmaceuticals). The establishment of the University of Ulm in 1967, which focuses on biomedicine, the sciences, and engineering, helped support a transition to high-tech industry, especially after the crisis of classical industries in the 1980s. 

Companies with headquarters in Ulm include:
 Britax (child safety products) European headquarters in nearby Leipheim
  (book printing)
 Gardena AG (gardening tools)
 H. Krieghoff GmbH (weapons for hunting and sports since 1886)
 Iveco Magirus AG
 J. G. Anschütz (firearms for sports and hunting)
 Liqui Moly (additives, oils, car care products)
 Müller Ltd. & Co. KG (major German trade company)
 Ratiopharm (pharmaceuticals)
  (dried fruits, coffee, tea)
 Uzin Utz AG (construction materials)
 Walther Arms (fire arms, especially pistols)
 Wieland Group (non-ferrous semi-finished products)
 Zwick Roell Group www.zwick.de (Materials Testing Machines)

Companies with important sites in Ulm include:
 AEG
 Atmel
 BMW Car IT GmbH
 Continental AG
 Daimler: Daimler Forschungszentrum (research centre) and Daimler TSS (car IT specialist)
 Deutsche Telekom AG
 Elektrobit Automotive GmbH
 EADS, European Aeronautic Defence and Space Company
 Nokia Networks
 Nuance Communications Speech Recognition (research departments)
 Siemens AG
 Harman International Industries

Ecology 
In 2007 the City of Ulm was awarded the European Energy Award for its remarkable local energy management and its efforts to combat climate change. Examples of these efforts are a biomass power plant operated by the Fernwärme Ulm GmbH (10 MW electrical output), and the world's biggest passive house office building, the so-called Energon, located in the "Science City" near the university campus. Moreover, the city of Ulm boasts the second largest solar power production in Germany. For all new buildings, a strict energy standard (German KFW40 standard) has been mandatory since April 2008. Ulm Minster has been fully powered by renewables since January 2008. Until the end of 2011 as a European pilot project a self-sustaining data-centre will be constructed in the west-city of Ulm. There is a solar-powered ferry that crosses the Danube 7 days a week in summer. The "Bündnis 100% Erneuerbare Energien" was founded in February 2010 with the aim of bringing together the people and organisations seeking to promote the transition to 100% renewable energy in Ulm and Neu-Ulm by 2030.

Transportation 

Ulm is situated at the crossroads of the A8 motorway (connecting the principal cities of southern Germany, Stuttgart and Munich), and the A7 motorway (one of the motorways running from northern to southern Europe).

The city's railway station is served, among other lines, by one of the European train routes (Paris – Strasbourg – Stuttgart – Ulm – Munich – Vienna – Budapest). Direct connections to Berlin are also available.

Ulm's public transport system is based on several bus lines and two tram lines. Several streets in the old town are for the use of pedestrians and cyclists only. Ulm was the first area to be served by the Daimler AG's Car2Go carsharing service in 2008. However, the service in Ulm was discontinued at the end of 2014.

Education and culture 

The University of Ulm was founded in 1967 and focuses on the sciences, medicine, engineering, and mathematics / economics. With about 10,000 students, it is one of the smaller universities in Germany.

Ulm is also the seat of the city's University of Applied Sciences, founded in 1960 as a public school of engineering. The school also houses numerous students from around the world as part of an international study abroad programme.

In 1953, Inge Aicher-Scholl, Otl Aicher and Max Bill founded the Ulm School of Design (German: Hochschule für Gestaltung – HfG Ulm), a design school in the tradition of the Bauhaus, which was, however, closed in 1968.

Ulm's public library features over 480,000 print media. The city has a public theatre with drama, opera and ballet, several small theatres, and a professional philharmonic orchestra.

Sport 

SSV Ulm 1846, multi-sports club, former football Bundesliga club, now Regionalliga Süd
Ratiopharm Ulm, basketball club, Basketball Bundesliga

Sights

Historic 
 Ulm Minster (German: , built 1377–1891) with the world's highest church steeple ( high and 768 steps). Choir stalls by Jörg Syrlin the Elder (1469–1474), famous sculpture  (Man of Sorrows) by Hans Multscher (1429).
 The old  (fishermen's quarter) on the River Blau, with half-timbered houses, cobblestone streets, and picturesque footbridges.
 The remaining section of the city walls, along the river, with the 14th-century  (butchers' tower) ( high).
 The  (Town Hall), built in 1370, featuring some brilliantly coloured murals dating from the mid-16th century. On the gable is an astronomical clock dating from 1520. Restored after serious damage in 1944. Photos of the  can be seen at Tripadvisor.
 The  inn, a medieval complex of several houses (15th / 16th century, extensions from the 19th century), where German kings and emperors were accommodated during their travels.
 Several large buildings from the late Middle Ages / renaissance used for various purposes (especially storage of food and weapons), e.g. .
 Ulm Federal Fortifications are the largest preserved fortifications and were built from 1842 to 1859 to protect from attacks by France.
 The historic district , a residential area with many buildings from before 1700.
 Wiblingen Abbey, a former Benedictine abbey in the suburb of Wiblingen in the south of Ulm. The church shows characteristics of late baroque and early classicism. Its library is a masterpiece of rococo.

Contemporary 
 Building of the Ulm School of Design (German:  – HfG Ulm), an important school of design (1953–1968) in the succession of the Bauhaus.
 , a house for public events built by Richard Meier, directly adjacent to the minster.
 , the building of the public library of Ulm was erected by Gottfried Böhm in the form of a glass pyramid and is situated directly adjacent to the town hall.
 Kunsthalle Weishaupt is the highlight in Ulm's New Centre.

Museums 
 The Kunsthalle Weishaupt. The private Collection shows modern art from 1945.
 Ulm Museum houses a significant collection of art and craftwork from the Middle Ages, the Löwenmensch figurine – a 40,000-year-old lion-headed figurine which is the oldest known human/animal shaped sculpture in the world – and various European and American art from the years after 1945. The museum has alternating exhibitions.
 The  offers a permanent exhibition about the history of grain, baking, milling and bread culture.
 The exhibitions in the  follow the varied history of the Danube Swabians (Donauschwaben) emigrants.

Memorials 
The house itself and the whole district were destroyed in the firebombing of 1944.
Their family's house near the memorial was destroyed in the firebombing of 1944.
 The Memorial to Deserters – Located near the university's botanical garden, it commemorates those who deserted from the  during World War II. It was originally erected on 9 September 1989, and was moved to its current location in July 2005. The Monument represents the idea: "Desertion is not reprehensible, war is".

Other landmarks 
 The , the university's botanical garden
 Silo tower of the mill company  (Schapfen Mill Tower)
 , television and radio tower
 Medium wave transmission mast Ulm-Jungingen
 FM and TV mast Ulm-Kuhberg
 The  Ulm, the zoo. It was opened in 1935, closed in 1944 and reopened in 1966.

Notable people

Born in Ulm 
 Otl Aicher (1922–1991), graphic designer, co-founder of Ulm School of Design, (German: Hochschule für Gestaltung – HfG Ulm), and creator of Rotis font
 Ernst Bauer (1917–1991), resistance fighter and publisher
 Max Bentele (1909–2006), mechanical engineer, jet-engine pioneer, father of the Wankel rotary engine
 Albrecht Berblinger (1770–1829), flight pioneer
 Dieter Braun (b. 1943), Motorcycle Grand Prix racer
 Hermann Duckek (1936–2001), riding master and Olympic equestrian arena designer

 Albert Einstein (1879–1955), physicist, philosopher, scientist, Nobel Prize-winner
 Jerome Emser (1477–1527), a German theologian and antagonist of Luther.
 Helmut Ensslin (1909–1984), Protestant parson and father of RAF-member Gudrun Ensslin
 Anna Essinger (1879–1960) educator; co-founder and headmistress of Bunce Court School
 Johann Faulhaber (1580–1635), mathematician, inventor of Faulhaber's formula.
 Nikolaus Federmann (1505–1542), adventurer and conquistador in modern-day Venezuela and Colombia, co-founder of Santafé de Bogotá
 Johann Freinsheim (1608–1660), a German classical scholar and critic.
 Eugen Haile (1873–1933), composer, singer and accompanist
 Fritz Hartnagel (1917–2001), officer and jurist, fiancé of Sophie Scholl
 Hellmut Hattler (b. 1952) jazz and rock bass player (Kraan)
 Max Hattler (b. 1976) artist and film-maker
 Johann Christoph Heilbronner (1706–c.1747) mathematical historian
 Leo Hepp (1907–1987), officer of the Wehrmacht and General of the Bundeswehr
 Dieter Hoeneß (b. 1953), former football player, former general manager of Hertha BSC and VfL Wolfsburg football club
 Uli Hoeneß (b. 1952), former football player, president of Bayern Munich football club
 Annemarie Huste (1943–2016), chef to Jackie Kennedy, executive chef Gourmet Magazine, author of 6 cookbooks
 Otto Kässbohrer (1904–1989), entrepreneur and constructor
 Karl Kimmich (1880–1945), banker
 Hildegard Knef (1925–2002), actress, singer and writer
 Mike Krüger (b. 1951) comedian, actor and singer
 Hellmuth Laegeler (1902–1972), major general in the Wehrmacht
 Hans Maler zu Schwaz (1480/1488 – 1526/1529) painter, active as portraitist at Schwaz near Innsbruck. 
 Erwin Piscator (1893–1966), theatre director and innovator
 Sam Rosen (b. 1947) an American sportscaster (MSG Network)
 Claudia Roth (b. 1955), politician, chairman of the German Green Party
 Wilhelm Schuler (1914–2010), chemist, inventor and entrepreneur in the second half of the 20th century.
 Katharina Sophia Volz (1987), a medical researcher and entrepreneur.

Otherwise associated with Ulm 
 Max Bill (1908–1994), architect and artist, co-founder and director of the Ulm School of Design (German:  – HfG Ulm)
 Robert Bosch (1861 in Albeck – 1942), industrialist, engineer and inventor, founder of Robert Bosch GmbH.
  (1450-1505), stonemason and master builder, helped construct Ulm Minster
 Rene Descartes (1596–1650), philosopher, experienced a powerful vision near Ulm in 1619. 
 Ulrich Ensingen (1350/60 – 1419), master builder, helped construct Ulm Minster and Strasbourg Cathedral
 Leonhard Hutter (1563 in Nellingen – 1616) a German Lutheran theologian.
 Herbert von Karajan, (1908–1989), conductor, Kapellmeister in Ulm, 1929–1934.
 Johannes Kepler (1571–1630), a German mathematician, astronomer and astrologer; lived in Ulm
 Gerhard Klopfer (1905–1987), senior official of the Nazi Party, SS General. Present at the Wannsee Conference; tax advisor and lawyer in Ulm postwar
 Hans Multscher (ca.1400 – 1467 in Ulm), a German sculptor and painter.
 Erwin Rommel (1891 in Heidenheim – 1944 at Herrlingen) a German field marshal in WWII.
 Hans Scholl (1918–1943) & Sophie Scholl (1921–1943), founded the White Rose, spent their youth in Ulm
 Carl Teike (1864–1922) , composed the military march Alte Kameraden in Ulm in 1889

International relations 

Ulm is a member city of the Eurotowns network.

Ulm is officially not twinned. But there are relations with:

 Arad, Romania
 Baja, Hungary
 Bratislava, Slovakia 
 Budapest, Hungary
 Cluj-Napoca, Romania
 Jinotega, Nicaragua
 Kladovo, Serbia
 New Ulm, Minnesota, United States 
 Novi Sad, Serbia
 Sibiu, Romania
 Silistra, Bulgaria
 Subotica, Serbia
 Timișoara in Romania
 Tulcea, Romania
 Vidin, Bulgaria
 Vukovar, Croatia

References

Notes

Bibliography 
 Johannes Baier: Über die Tertiärbildungen im Ulmer Raum. In: Documenta Naturae. 168; München, 2008. .

External links 

 Official website of the city
 Official Tourism Website of Ulm and Neu-Ulm
 Official website of the University of Ulm
 Ulm public library  (in German)

 
1803 disestablishments
States and territories established in 1181
Tübingen (region)
Cities in Baden-Württemberg
Populated places on the Danube
Historic Jewish communities
Holocaust locations in Germany
Württemberg